"Whistle Wars" is a song by American DJ Kayzo. It was released on May 30, 2017, via Welcome Records.

Background 
The song received a release date after a year of being performed at music festivals as an "ID" (unknown title). Kayzo incorporated 'hard-hitting' bass, a 'killer' drop and an intense beat to the song. It was described as genre-bending and bass-stomping.

Track listing

References 

2017 songs
2017 singles
Electronic songs